Australia uses three main time zones: Australian Western Standard Time (AWST; UTC+08:00), Australian Central Standard Time (ACST; UTC+09:30), and Australian Eastern Standard Time (AEST; UTC+10:00). Time is regulated by the individual state governments, some of which observe daylight saving time (DST). 
Standard time was introduced in the 1890s when all of the Australian colonies adopted it. Before the switch to standard time zones, each local city or town was free to determine its local time, called local mean time. Now, Western Australia uses Western Standard Time; South Australia and the Northern Territory use Central Standard Time; while New South Wales, Queensland, Tasmania, Victoria, Jervis Bay Territory, and the Australian Capital Territory use Eastern Standard Time.

Daylight saving time (+1 hour) is used in jurisdictions in the south and south-east: South Australia, New South Wales, Victoria, Tasmania, Jervis Bay Territory and the Australian Capital Territory. It is not currently used in Western Australia, the Northern Territory or Queensland.

Norfolk Island has NFT (UTC+11:00; 1 hour ahead of AEST) and during summer has NFDT (UTC+12:00; 1 hour ahead of AEDT).

History

The standardisation of time in Australia began in 1892, when surveyors from the six colonies in Australia met in Melbourne for the Intercolonial Conference of Surveyors. The delegates accepted the recommendation of the 1884 International Meridian Conference to adopt Greenwich Mean Time (GMT) as the basis for standard time.

The colonies enacted time zone legislation, which took effect in February 1895. The clocks were set ahead of GMT by 8 hours in Western Australia; by 9 hours in South Australia (and the Northern Territory, which it governed); and by 10 hours in Queensland, New South Wales, Victoria, and Tasmania. The three time zones became known as Western Standard Time, Central Standard Time, and Eastern Standard Time. Broken Hill in the far west of New South Wales (strictly speaking, the county of Yancowinna) also adopted Central Standard Time due to it being connected at the time by rail to Adelaide but not Sydney.

In May 1899, in a break with the common international practice of setting one-hour intervals between adjacent time zones, South Australia advanced Central Standard Time by thirty minutes after lobbying by businesses who wanted to be closer to Melbourne time and cricketers and footballers who wanted more daylight to practice in the evenings. It also meant that South Australia became one of only a few places in the world which uses a time-zone meridian located outside of its geographical boundaries. Attempts to undo this change in 1986 and 1994 failed.

When the Northern Territory was separated from South Australia and placed under the jurisdiction of the Federal Government, the Territory kept Central Standard Time. Likewise, when the ACT and Jervis Bay Territory were broken off from New South Wales, they retained Eastern Standard Time.

Since 1899, the only major changes in Australian time zones have been setting of clocks half an hour later than Eastern time (GMT plus 10:30) on the territory of Lord Howe Island, and Norfolk Island changing from UTC+11:30 to UTC+11:00 on 4 October 2015.

When abbreviating "Australian Central Time" and "Australian Eastern Time", in domestic contexts the leading "Australian" may be omitted; however, the prefix "A" is often used to avoid ambiguity with the time zone abbreviations "CST" and "EST" referring to the Central and Eastern Time Zones in North America.

Civil time and legislation
Though the governments of the states and territories have the power to legislate variations in time, the standard time within each of these is set related to Coordinated Universal Time (UTC) as determined by the International Bureau of Weights and Measures and set by section 8AA of the National Measurement Act of 1960 of the Commonwealth.

Australia has kept a version of the UTC atomic time scale since the 1990s, but Greenwich Mean Time (GMT) remained the formal basis for the standard times of all of the states until 2005. In November 2004, the state and territory attorneys-general endorsed a proposal from the Australian National Measurement Institute to adopt UTC as the standard of all Australian standard times, thereby eliminating the effects of slight variations in the rate of rotation of the Earth that are inherent in mean solar time. All jurisdictions have adopted the UTC standard, starting on 1 September 2005.

In Victoria, South Australia, Tasmania and the ACT, the starting and ending dates of daylight saving times are officially determined by proclamations, declarations, or regulation made by the State Governor or by the responsible minister. Such instruments may be valid for only the current year, and so this section generally only refers to the legislation. In New South Wales and Western Australia, the starting and ending dates, if any, are to be set by legislation.

Australian Western Standard Time (AWST) – UTC+08:00

Western Australia – Standard Time Act 2005

Australian Central Standard Time (ACST) – UTC+09:30

South Australia – Standard Time Act 2009 and the Daylight Saving Act 1971
Northern Territory – Standard Time Act 2005
Australian Western Central Standard Time (AWCST) UTC+8:45

 Small portion of south eastern corner of Western Australia
 Used in following towns: Border Village, Eucla, Mundrabilla, Madura, Cocklebiddy

Australian Eastern Standard Time (AEST) – UTC+10:00

Queensland – Standard Time Act 1894
New South Wales – Standard Time Act 1987 No 149
Australian Capital Territory and Jervis Bay Territory – Standard Time and Summer Time Act 1972
Victoria – Summer Time Act 1972
Tasmania – Standard Time Act 1895 and the Daylight Saving Act 2007

Daylight saving time (DST)

The choice of whether to use DST is a matter for the governments of the individual states and territories. However, during World War I and World War II all states and territories used daylight saving time (DST). In 1968 Tasmania became the first state to use DST in peacetime, followed in 1971 by New South Wales, Victoria, Queensland, South Australia, and the Australian Capital Territory. Western Australia and the Northern Territory did not adopt it. Queensland abandoned DST in 1972. Queensland and Western Australia have occasionally used DST during the past 40 years during trial periods.

The main DST zones are the following:
 (Australian) Central Daylight Saving Time (ACDT or CDST) – UTC+10:30, in South Australia and Broken Hill, New South Wales
 (Australian) Eastern Daylight Saving Time (AEDT or EDST) – UTC+11:00, in New South Wales, the ACT, Victoria, and Tasmania

During the usual periods of DST, the three standard time zones in Australia become five zones. This includes the areas that do not observe DST: Western Australia (UTC+08:00), the Northern Territory (UTC+09:30), and Queensland (UTC+10:00).

The change to and from DST takes place at 02:00 local standard time the appropriate Sunday. Until 2008, DST usually began on the last Sunday in October, and ended on the last Sunday in March. However, Tasmania, given its latitude further south, began DST earlier, on the first Sunday in October, and ended it later, on the first Sunday of April.

On 12 April 2007, New South Wales, Victoria, Tasmania, and the ACT agreed to common beginning and ending dates for DST from 2008. DST in these states and South Australia began on the first Sunday in October and ended on the first Sunday in April. Western Australia was then the only state to use DST from the last Sunday in October to the last Sunday in March, but it abolished DST in 2009.

Anomalies

Unlike the rest of New South Wales, Broken Hill and the surrounding region (specified as Yancowinna County) observes Australian Central Standard Time (UTC+09:30), a time zone it shares with nearby South Australia and the Northern Territory.

Resort manager Alistair Cooray says no-one is sure how the time zone came about. 'I believe it started in the late '50s early '60s as a way to give the guests a bit more daylight time on the island and no-one knows for sure though.'"

A compromise between Western and Central time (UTC+08:45, without DST), unofficially known as Central Western Standard Time, is used in one area in the southeastern corner of Western Australia and one roadhouse in South Australia. Towns east of Caiguna on the Eyre Highway (including Eucla, Cocklebiddy, Madura, Mundrabilla and Border Village, just over the border into South Australia), follow "CWT" instead of Western Australian time. The total population of that area is estimated at 200 people. This area did not change when South Australia introduced DST. During the Western Australian trial of DST from 2006 to 2009, this area also sets its clocks ahead one hour during summer. This time zone is not officially recognised, but is marked by official road signs. It is tracked in the tz database, the record of time zones for computers, as "Australia/Eucla".

A number of small towns in Outback Western Australia also follow UTC+09:30 rather than UTC+08. These towns include Blackstone, Irrunytju, Warakurna, Wanarn, Kiwirrkurra, and Tjukurla.

The Indian Pacific train has its own time zone—a so-called "train time" when travelling between Kalgoorlie, Western Australia and Port Augusta, South Australia—which was at UTC+09:00 hours during November 2005 when DST was observed in the eastern and southern states.

External territories
Australia's external territories follow different time zones.

Special events
In 2000, all of the eastern jurisdictions that normally observe DST—New South Wales, Victoria, the ACT, and Tasmania—began DST early because of the Summer Olympic Games held in Sydney. These jurisdictions moved to DST on 27 August 2000. South Australians did not change their clocks until the usual date, which was 29 October 2000.

In 2006, all of the states that followed DST (the above states and South Australia) delayed their return to Standard Times by one week, because of the 2006 Commonwealth Games held in Melbourne in March. DST ended on 2 April 2006.

National times
There are situations in which a nationwide time is in effect. In the case of business activities, a national time can be used. For example, a prospectus for the issue of stock in a company would usually set the closing time for offers at some location (e.g. Sydney) as the time when offers must be received, regardless of the source of the offer. Similarly, tenders for their sale of stock usually set out the time at a given location by which they must be received to be considered. Another example is the Australian Securities Exchange which operates on Eastern Standard Time.

On the other hand, Federal legislation yields to state-regulated standard times in many diverse situations. For example, it yields in setting the normal working times of Federal employees, the recognition of public holidays, etc. The Federal government also relies on local times for Federal elections, so that the polls in Western Australia close two or three hours after those in the eastern states. Also, documents to be filed in a Federal Court may be filed based on the local time. The effect of this is that if there had been a failure to file a legal document on time in an eastern State, that document can sometimes still be filed (within two hours) in Western Australia.

IANA time zone database
The 18 zones for Australia as given by zone.tab of the IANA time zone database. Columns marked * are from the zone.tab.

Debate, trials and referendums

Queensland
Queensland has had a particularly involved debate over daylight saving time, with public opinion geographically divided. A referendum on DST was held in 1992, following a three-year trial (1989/90–1991/92), and was defeated with a 54.5 per cent negative vote. The referendum result displayed a distinct trend—that public opinion on DST in Queensland is geographically divided, with the negative vote being strongest in northern and western districts, while the positive vote being strongest in the southeastern region (e.g. in Brisbane). The holiday islands (Hayman, Lindeman, Hamilton) continued to observed DST in defiance of the Standard Time Act (The "Australia/Lindeman" Timezone in the tz database is based on this). However the practice was abandoned 2 years later in 1995. Heron Island, 72 km off the coast off Gladstone, has two time zones: the resort follows DST all year round, whereas "the Marine Research Centre and the Parks and Wildlife office on the island remain on Eastern Standard Time".

Since the late 1900s, there have been a number of petitions submitted to Legislative Assembly of Queensland, lobbying for the introduction of daylight saving time or for another referendum to be held. A petition in 2006 was signed by 62,232 people. In response to these petitions, then Queensland Premier Peter Beattie commissioned research to find out if it should be re-introduced into Queensland. Around this time, Beattie predicted that daylight saving in Queensland would increase the rate of skin cancer in the state, an assertion for which there is no evidence, according to the Queensland Cancer Fund.

In October 2007, the government-commissioned research was presented to the new Premier Anna Bligh, who ruled out holding a new referendum, despite the report indicating that 59 per cent of the residents of Queensland and 69 per cent of those in southeastern Queensland to be in favour of adopting daylight saving.

In December 2008, the Daylight Saving for South East Queensland (DS4SEQ) political party was officially registered, to advocate for the use of a two-time-zone system for DST in Queensland, with most of the state (in land area) using standard time. This party contested the March 2009 Queensland State election with 32 candidates, and it received about one per cent of the statewide primary vote.

In early 2010, the DS4SEQ political party approached the independent member, Peter Wellington, to introduce a private member's bill for DST.
Since Wellington agreed with the principles of the DS4SEQ proposal, specifically the dual-time-zone system, he drafted the Daylight Saving for South East Queensland Referendum Bill 2010 and he submitted this bill to Queensland Parliament on 14 April 2010. Wellington has called for a referendum to be held at the next state election on the introduction of DST into southeastern Queensland under the dual-time-zone system.

In response to this bill, the Premier of Queensland, Anna Bligh, announced a community consultation process, which resulted in over 74,000 respondents participating, 64 per cent of whom voted in favour of a trial, and 63 per cent of whom were in favour of holding a referendum. The decision announced by the Premier on 7 June 2010 was that her Government would not support the bill because rural Queenslanders were overwhelmingly opposed to DST. The Bill was defeated in Queensland Parliament on 15 June 2011.
In 1971 the premier Joh Bjelke-Petersen had a one-year trial and a referendum which was soundly defeated.

Western Australia
Western Australia has also had a particularly involved debate over DST, with the issue being put to a referendum four times: in 1975, 1984, 1992, and 2009. All of these proposals to adopt DST were defeated. Voters registered a negative vote of 54.6 per cent in the 2009 referendum, the highest percentage for all four of these referendums. Each referendum followed a trial period during which the state observed DST. The first three followed a one-year trial, while the 2006 Western Australian Daylight Saving Bill (No. 2) 2006 instituted a trial of DST beginning on 3 December 2006, and lasting for three years.

See also

 List of time zones
List of military time zones
UTC+10:00

Notes

References
 The Australian National Time System National Standards Commission Leaflet No. 8, January 2003, linked via Wayback Machine
 NSW Legislative Council Hansard, 2 March 2005
 Daylight Saving Petitions
 Daylight Saving Time – history of daylight saving time implementation dates at the Bureau of Meteorology website

External links
 Information on time zones from official Government web site
 Daylight Saving for South East Queensland political party Official DS4SEQ website

 
Science and technology in Australia
Standards of Australia
Articles containing video clips